Deery Family Homestead is a historic farm and national historic district located in West Vincent Township, Chester County, Pennsylvania. The district includes 10 contributing buildings on a self-sustaining family compound. The buildings include the following on the Main Farm: the main house, large stone and frame bank barn (1819), and stone and frame wagon shed.  On the Henry Derry Farm are the main house, smaller house, root cellar, large stone bank barn, and two small stone buildings.  The district also includes the George Deery House (bef. 1819) and Tenant House.

It was added to the National Register of Historic Places in 1977.

References

Farms on the National Register of Historic Places in Pennsylvania
Historic districts on the National Register of Historic Places in Pennsylvania
Houses completed in 1819
Houses in Chester County, Pennsylvania
National Register of Historic Places in Chester County, Pennsylvania